Baguley is an electoral ward of the city of Manchester in Wythenshawe, England.

Baguley may also refer to:

 Ernest E. Baguley (1863–1948), British engineer
 Baguley Cars Ltd, the original locomotive manufacturing company created by Ernest E. Baguley
 Baguley-Drewry, a locomotive manufacturer
 Baguley Hall
 Baguley railway station
 Baguley tram stop
 Baguley valve gear, a type of steam engine valve gear invented by Ernest E. Baguley

See also
 Bagguley (surname)